Frank Curtis (12 November 1890 – 1957) was a Welsh footballer who played in the Southern League for West Ham United, and in the Football League for Wolverhampton Wanderers and Reading.

Career

Curtis played in the Southern League Division One for West Ham United, making three appearances during the 1909–10 season and a further three in 1910–11.

Curtis joined Wolverhampton Wanderers in June 1914 from his hometown club Llanelly. He made his league debut on 1 September 1914 in a 1–1 draw at Clapham Orient and ended the season as Wolves' leading goalscorer with 25 goals.

The outbreak of the First World War halted his league career for four years, and he made just three further appearances for the club afterward. He left to join Reading, newly elected to the Football League, in Summer 1920.

He later served non-league Bilston United and Kidderminster Harriers before retiring to work in engineering in his native South Wales.

References

Bibliography
 

1890 births
1957 deaths
Footballers from Llanelli
Welsh footballers
English Football League players
South Liverpool F.C. (1890s) players
West Ham United F.C. players
Llanelli Town A.F.C. players
Wolverhampton Wanderers F.C. players
Reading F.C. players
Bilston Town F.C. players
Kidderminster Harriers F.C. players
Association football forwards